Juan Velarde (born 20 July 1954) is a Peruvian former wrestler who competed in the 1972 Summer Olympics.

References

External links
 

1954 births
Living people
Olympic wrestlers of Peru
Wrestlers at the 1972 Summer Olympics
Peruvian male sport wrestlers
20th-century Peruvian people